Air Asturias was a short-lived airline based in Oviedo/Asturias, Spain. Its operations were started by LTE in November 2006 and ceased on January 26, 2007.

History 
The airline was established on 13 July 2005 and never started its own operations because Air Asturias never obtained its airline certificate. LTE started operations in behalf Air Asturias on 6 November 2006 using LTE's airline certificate and an Airbus A320-214 aircraft. It ceased operations on January 26, 2007.

Destinations
As of January 2007 LTE operated services to the following destinations in behalf of Air Asturias:

Asturias (Asturias Airport)
Brussels (Brussels Airport)
Lisbon (Portela Airport)
Madrid (Madrid Barajas International Airport)
Paris (Charles de Gaulle International Airport)
Rome (Leonardo da Vinci International Airport)

Fleet 
Air Asturias fleet never included any plane. The following LTE's plane was painted in Air Asturias color scheme:

1 Airbus A320-214 (EC-ISI)

References

External links

Air Asturias Fleet

Defunct airlines of Spain
Defunct European low-cost airlines
Airlines established in 2005
Airlines disestablished in 2007
Transport in Asturias
Spanish companies established in 2006